Josip Torbar (1824–1900) was a Croatian natural scientist, educator and politician.

Torbar was born in Krašić. He was ordained as a Roman Catholic priest in 1849. His scientific works spanned biology, geology, meteorology and history of science.

In 1866 Torbar became one of 12 original members of the Yugoslav Academy of Sciences and Arts, and served as its chairman from 1890 until his death. He was a co-founder and the president of the Croatian Mountaineering Association.

Sources
Josip Torbar (1824.-1900.) 
Zagreb moj grad, issue 8, p. 24 

1824 births
1900 deaths
19th-century Croatian Roman Catholic priests
Croatian scientists
People from Krašić
Members of the Croatian Academy of Sciences and Arts
Representatives in the Croatian Parliament (1848–1918)